Karl Alfred Lanz (25 October 1847 – 1 May 1907) was a Swiss painter and sculptor.

Works
Johann Heinrich Pestalozzi memorial in Yverdon
Monument to General Dufour, 1884, on Place Neuve, Geneva

External links
 
 
 

1847 births
1907 deaths
Swiss sculptors